Fagging  was a traditional practice in British public schools and also at many other boarding schools, whereby younger pupils were required to act as personal servants to the eldest boys. Although probably originating earlier, the first accounts of fagging appeared in the late 17th century. 
Fagging sometimes involved physical abuse and/or sexual abuse. Although lessening in severity over the centuries, the practice continued in some institutions until the end of the 20th century.

History
Fagging originated as a structure for maintaining order in boarding schools, when schoolmasters' authority was practically limited to the classroom. Thomas Arnold, headmaster of Rugby from 1828 to 1841, defined fagging as the power given by the authorities of the school to the Sixth Form, to be exercised by them over younger boys. Fagging was a fully established system at St Paul's, Eton, and Winchester in the sixteenth century.

Fagging carried with it well-defined rights and duties on both sides. The senior, sometimes called the fag-master, was the protector of his fags and responsible for their happiness and good conduct. In case of any problem outside the classroom, such as bullying or injustice, a junior boy's recourse was to him, not to a form master or housemaster, and, except in the gravest cases, all incidents were dealt with by the fag-master on his own responsibility.

The duties undertaken by fags, the time taken, and their general treatment varied widely. Each school had its own traditions and expectations. Until around 1900, a fag's duties would include such humble tasks as blacking boots, brushing clothes, and cooking breakfasts, and there was no limit as to hours the fag would be expected to work. Later, fagging was restricted to such tasks as running errands and bringing tea to the fag-master's study. The 1911 Britannica details an evolution of the role at Eton. Under school rules, fagging might involve harsh discipline and corporal punishment when those were standard practices.

In 1930, an inquest into the death of a 14-year-old schoolboy from Sedbergh School heard that, rather than returning after holidays, he took his life because of his dislike of the fagging system. The jury returned a verdict of suicide and recommended the discontinuation of the practice in public schools.

During the late 20th century, fagging became unfashionable in British public schools, as attitudes to boarding education and child development changed. Despite the reluctance of senior boys who had served their time and expected to enjoy the benefits of the system, between the 1960s and 1980s first the duties became less onerous and then the system was abolished at most major public schools. The practice is believed to have become obsolete in Britain.

There is a history of fagging in schools in former British colonies (see India, South Africa) where fagging continues in a limited form at some schools.

In 2017, the actor Simon Williams described how, as a new pupil at Harrow School in 1959, he was required to fag for a prefect four years his senior, involving duties such as spit-shining his shoes, making his bed, serving tea, and even warming the toilet seat.

Sexual abuse
Fagging was sometimes associated with both consensual sexual service and sexual abuse. Christopher Tyerman, writing about the history of Harrow School, stated that in some situations, fagging could either encourage or conceal sexual activity between students, and that, at Harrow, fagging began to decline around the same time as the school started actively discouraging homosexual behavior  but continued in formal school life until the 1990s.

In memoirs, literature and art

Many authors have written of the experience of the harsh regimes experienced within public or boarding schools; some in novels and others in memoirs.
 Percy Bysshe Shelley, who entered Eton College in 1804, was bullied for refusing to aid his assigned prefect.
 Fagging is depicted in the 1857 novel Tom Brown's School Days by Thomas Hughes, which is set at Rugby School.
 E. W. Hornung's stories about fictional gentleman thief A. J. Raffles (created in 1898) are narrated by Raffles's companion Bunny Manders, who fagged for Raffles in their school years.
 C. S. Lewis's partial autobiography, Surprised by Joy (1955), mentions fagging (see Chapter VI, pp. 94–95).
 Some characters in P. G. Wodehouse's school stories are fags, such as Reginald Robinson in The Pothunters (1902) and Thomas Renford in The Gold Bat (1904).
 In his 1984 autobiography, Roald Dahl states that when he was a young fag, he was instructed to warm toilet seats for older boys at Repton School, and he wrote a fictional account of the experience of fagging in his short story Galloping Foxley.
 Yana Toboso's manga series Black Butler showcases the fagging system in its Public School Arc, with the main protagonist, Ciel Phantomhive, becoming a fag when he enrolls to investigate events at Weston College.
 If.... (1968) shows life in a public school and the fagging system, specifically how junior boys are made to act as personal servants for the eldest boys and are discussed as sex objects.

See also

 Batman (military)
 Dedovshchina
 Hazing
 Plebe Summer
 Ragging
 Senpai and kōhai

References

Further reading
Malet, Sir Alexander (1828) Some Account of the System of Fagging at Winchester School: With Remarks, and a Correspondence with Dr. Williams on the Late Expulsions Thence for Resistance to the Authority of the Præfects. Publisher: J. Ridgway
Wickham, F. (1847) Fagging: is it hopelessly inseparable from the discipline of a Public School? Publisher: J Hatchard & Son, London
Moberly, Bishop G. (1848) Sermons preached at Winchester College. Second series, with a preface on “Fagging.” Publisher: Rivington, London

Bullying
Education issues
Rites of passage
English culture
Education in England